The yellow-mantled widowbird (Euplectes macroura), also known as the yellow-backed widow, is a species of bird in the family Ploceidae. It is the type species of the genus Euplectes, originally named for the city of Ouidah in Benin. Nowadays the name whydah (from "Ouidah") is however applied to some species in the Viduidae.

Description
Males are larger than females and acquire longer tails and striking black and golden yellow plumages in the breeding season. The mantle colour is either golden yellow, or in the case of the northeastern race, E. m. macrocercus, black. The yellow shoulders persist in all male plumages, whether breeding or non-breeding.

Range and habitat
Its natural habitat is subtropical or tropical seasonally wet or flooded lowland grassland. It is widely distributed in Africa, and is found in Angola, Benin, Burkina Faso, Burundi, Cameroon, Central African Republic, Chad, Republic of the Congo, Democratic Republic of the Congo, Ivory Coast, Gabon, Gambia, Ghana, Guinea, Guinea-Bissau, Liberia, Malawi, Mali, Mozambique, Niger, Nigeria, Senegal, Sierra Leone, Sudan, Tanzania, Togo, Zambia and Zimbabwe.

Races

The distinctive race E. m. subsp. macrocercus occurs in Eritrea, Ethiopia, western Kenya and Uganda.

References

External links
 (Yellow-mantled widowbird = ) Yellow-backed widow - Species text in The Atlas of Southern African Birds

yellow-mantled widowbird
Birds of Sub-Saharan Africa
yellow-mantled widowbird
yellow-mantled widowbird
Taxonomy articles created by Polbot